Disobedient is the fifth full-length studio album by American melodic hardcore band Stick to Your Guns, released on February 10, 2015. It is the band's first album to be produced by John Feldmann (The Used, Escape the Fate, Beartooth). This is the band's last release on Sumerian Records.

On October 21, 2014, the band released the first single off the album, "Nobody", with the music video premiering on Alternative Press.

The album was included at number 16 on Rock Sounds top 50 releases of 2015 list.

Though not ashamed of the album, vocalist Jesse Barnett has expressed that in hindsight, the album did not necessarily take the direction they wanted it to.

Track listing

Personnel
Stick to Your Guns
 Jesse Barnett – lead vocals, additional guitars, piano, lyrics
 Josh James – lead guitar, backing vocals
 Chris Rawson – rhythm guitar, backing vocals
 Andrew Rose – bass, backing vocals
 George Schmitz – drums

Guest musicians
 Toby Morse (of H2O) – vocals on "RMA (Revolutionary Mental Attitude)"
 Scott Vogel (of Terror) – vocals on "I Choose Nothing"
 Walter Delgado (of Rotting Out) – vocals on "Nothing You Can Do to Me"

References
 Citations

Sources

 

2015 albums
Albums produced by John Feldmann
Stick to Your Guns (band) albums
Sumerian Records albums